Bradford United F.C. was an English football club based in Bradford, West Yorkshire.

History
The club was a member of the Yorkshire Football League from 1945 to 1948 and from 1950 to 1951.

References

Defunct football clubs in England
Yorkshire Football League
Defunct football clubs in West Yorkshire